The men's 20 kilometres walk at the 2018 Commonwealth Games, as part of the athletics programme, took place at Currumbin Beachfront on 8 April 2018.

Irfan Kolothum Thodi was later removed from the Games after a needle was found in his apartment, which was in contravention of Games policy.

Records
Prior to this competition, the existing world and Games records were as follows:

Schedule
The schedule was as follows:

All times are Australian Eastern Standard Time (UTC+10)

Results
The results were as follows:

Notes
 Also a British record
> Bent knee
~ Loss of contact

References

Men's 20 kilometres walk
2018